Henrietta Mondry is a New Zealand academic, and is a full professor at the University of Canterbury, specialising in Russian cultural history, especially in relation to the history of Jewish people in Russia. Mondry was elected a Fellow of the Royal Society Te Apārangi as of 2009.

Academic career

After an MA, Mondry earned a PhD titled The Evaluation Of Recent Trends In Soviet Dostoevsky Scholarship (1970s–1980s) at the University of Witwatersrand. Mondry taught at Witwatersrand from 1980, and was made Head of Russian Studies in 1987 and then associate professor in Russian. She was appointed to the University of Canterbury in 1994. She is a full professor at the University of Canterbury, where she coordinates the Russian programme.

Mondry has written more than ten books, over seventy scholarly articles and over forty book chapters. She was involved in developing two international journals, the New Zealand Slavonic Journal and the South African-published Slavic Almanac.

Selected works

Awards and honours 
Mondry was elected a Fellow of the Royal Society Te Apārangi in 2009. She was also elected a Fellow of the New Zealand Academy of Humanities (now the Humanities Society of New Zealand) the same year.

References

External links
 Google scholar profile

Fellows of the Royal Society of New Zealand
New Zealand women academics
University of the Witwatersrand alumni
Academic staff of the University of Canterbury
Living people
Year of birth missing (living people)